Macrocheles tridentinus is a species of mite in the family Macrochelidae.

References

tridentinus
Articles created by Qbugbot
Animals described in 1884